The Berlin Music Video Awards is an annual international festival held in Berlin, Germany to celebrate the art of music videos. The festival brings together music video enthusiasts, directors, producers, and musicians worldwide to showcase their work and network with other professionals.

The festival includes a variety of activities such as screenings of nominated music videos, fashion show, various workshops, DJ sets and live performances. Awards are given in a variety of categories, including Best Music Video, Best Director, and Best Cinematography.

The Berlin Music Video Awards provide a platform for emerging artists and established professionals to showcase their work and gain recognition for their cinematographic creativity and skills. The BMVA highlights that anyone can participate, and that quality, originality, and diversity are all valued.

History 
Aviel Silook, the producer and manager, founded the Berlin Music Video Awards (BMVA) in 2013. The founder initiated the festival and award ceremony because the concept did not yet exist in Berlin. Initially, it was aimed to be local but in the first year of existence, it became international with participants from Europe and North America. More award categories have been added since then, and international recognition has grown.

In the past, the Berlin Music Video Awards have featured a diverse range of nominees and jury members. Some of the notable nominees have included music videos by artists such as ASAP Rocky, Rammstein and Little Big (band), as well as up-and-coming artists from around the world.  The jury has included industry professionals from various backgrounds, including directors, producers, musicians, and journalists. The Berlin Music Video Awards continue to attract a wide range of talented nominees and industry professionals each year.

The BMVA is distinguished by a diverse lineup that includes low-budget productions, newcomers, and internationally recognized artists. As a result, it highlights the state of the art in the current music video industry and recognizes outstanding productions.

Program 

Every year, the BMVA takes place over four days in May/June. The nominees and awardees of the various music video categories are presented during the ceremony, and the winners of each category are announced and awarded. Furthermore, the show also consists of onstage live performances from renowned bands and musicians, like  Little Big (band), Vitalic, and members of The Prodigy. The festival is usually held in one of Berlin's popular clubs, such as Club GRETCHEN (2019/2018) or Nuke Club (2017). After-show parties are organised in connection with the award ceremony.  

In the years 2020 and 2021, the award ceremony took place digitally as a result of the global Covid-19 pandemic. The show was recorded at the KitKat Club (2020) and Alex Berlin (2021), who had been cooperating with the BMVA since its early years. In 2020/21, the hosts were Alexandrine Yetundey  and David Hailey. 

After two years of online editions, the Berlin Music Video Awards celebrated its 10th anniversary from June 8th to June 11th (2022) in Club Gretchen.

Categories 

Music Videos are awarded in the following categories at the BMVA:

 Best Music Video
 Best Animation
 Best Art Director
 Best Cinematography
 Best Editor
 Best Concept
 Best Director
 Best Experimental
 Best Low Budget
 Best Narrative
 Best Performer
 Best Production Company
 Best Song
 Best Visual Effects
 Most Bizarre
 Most Trashy

First-place winners in all categories receive a BMVA trophy, and the winner of the Best Music Video category receives a cash prize as well. 

The independent jury members are experts in their fields of the (music) video industry or previous awardees. Some of the jury members over the years have been Cheng-Hsu Chung, Alexander Dydyna  and Federico Abib.

Gallery

References 

Music festivals in Berlin